Verticordia pulchella is a flowering plant in the myrtle family, Myrtaceae and is endemic to the south-west of Western Australia. It is a much-branched shrub with short, narrow leaves and feathery red or red and yellow flowers with long styles in spring and early summer.

Description

Flowering time is from October to December.

Taxonomy and naming
Verticordia pulchella was first formally described by Alex George in 1991 and the description was published in Nuytsia. The specific epithet (pulchella) is a Latin word meaning "pretty" or "rather pretty" referring to the appearance of this species.

George placed this species in subgenus Verticordia, section Intricata along with V. monadelpha and V. mitchelliana.

Distribution and habitat
This verticordia grows in sand with loam and sometimes with clay, in heath and shrubland. It occurs in an area near Narrembeen, in the Avon Wheatbelt and Coolgardie biogeographic regions.

Conservation
Verticordia pulchella is classified as "Priority Two" by the Western Australian Government Department of Parks and Wildlife, meaning that it is poorly known and from only one or a few locations.

Use in horticulture
Verticordia pulchella has been difficult to propagate from cuttings and to establish in gardens. Some specimens have been grown from seed but have not survived for longer than a few months.

References

pulchella
Rosids of Western Australia
Eudicots of Western Australia
Plants described in 1991